Wa Ying College (also referred to as WYC) is a secondary school in Hong Kong, located at 8 Sheung Wo Street, Homantin, Kowloon, Hong Kong. The school is managed by the Methodist Church, Hong Kong.

History

Wa Ying College was founded as Wa Ying Middle School (Chinese name 華英中學) by the Methodist Church in 1913 in Foshan of Guangdong, China. The school quickly established itself as one of the three most prestigious middle schools in pre-World War II southern China.  During the War, the school relocated to Hong Kong in Tung Chung Fort, Tung Chung, Lantau Island and later moved to Shatin. It returned to Foshan after the War. In 1951, after the Communist Party of China came into power in mainland China, the Foshan-based Wa Ying Middle School was confiscated by the state owing to the People's Republic of China's atheist Communist ideology, under which religious organizations-run schools are not allowed to operate.  The Foshan No.1 Middle School (廣東省佛山市第一中學; pinyin Guangdong sheng Foshan shi Diyi Zhongxue, abbrev 佛山一中; pinyin Foshan Yizhong), was formed after the authorities merged the former Wa Ying Middle School with the public run Foshan Middle School (佛山中學; pinyin Foshan Zhongxue) and sited at the former Wa Ying Middle School.

In 1969, alumni of Wa Ying Middle School based in Hong Kong handed a proposal to the Chinese Methodist Church to re-establish the school in Hong Kong, then out of the People's Republic of China's control. The alumni pledged to raise funds to start the building project and entrusted the school to the Church as in the past. With less than 400 alumni, nearly $300,000 was raised. In addition to a loan of $250,000 and a subsidy of two million dollars granted from the Hong Kong Government, the dream of resuming the school came true. Construction work began at its present site at Ho Man Tin in 1970.

In September 1971, named Wa Ying College in English while keeping the Chinese name of its Foshan predecessor, started with 18 teachers and 12 classes. The school gradually expanded to up to 31 classes by the 1983-84 academic year.  The school campus has undergone a number of renovations over the years, with the most recent at the late 2005. The school joined the Voluntary Optimisation of Class Structure Scheme and reduced to 24 classes by the 2011-12 academic year.

In 2021 there was a proposal for the Hong Kong Legislative Council to spent $470 million Hong Kong dollars on renovating the school, but the renovation was voted down. RTHK noted that Wun Chi-wa, the principal, opposed the Extradition Bill previously proposed in the Legco.

Reputation and achievements
Wa Ying College is considered a school with an excellent reputation both district-wide and territory-wide. All Form 1 student intakes are band 1 primary school graduates and competition for a place at Wa Ying is highly intense, the admittance ratio for the year 2007-2008 is 14:1. In the past HKAL era, a majority (regularly 85%+) of its Form 7 graduates were admitted to universities in Hong Kong every year.  Since the new HKDSE exam has been put into practice, more than 60% of Wa Ying College's Form 6 graduates were admitted to local universities in both two cycles.

The school's policies are also known to be highly progressive.  Since its re-founding in Hong Kong in 1971, all teachers have been involved in the school's administrative work and the making of school policies through the system of functional committees.  The school also pioneered school counseling practices in Hong Kong by introducing social workers into the school and setting up peer counseling schemes  .  Most of the student welfare affairs have been managed by the democratically elected Wa Ying College Student Union since 1992.  The two subjects, Hong Kong Local History and Liberal Studies, were also introduced into the school curriculum long before they became fashionable in Hong Kong education.

In the introduction of new Senior Secondary Curriculum, Wa Ying College is one of the pioneer schools that offers Design and Applied Technology (DAT) as a technology-based elective, while most other schools offer the more common electives such as Finance and Information Technology related subjects at the initial stage . And this brave take proved to be a huge success as in the first HKDSE exam cycle, the highest achieving DAT candidate was a student from Wa Ying College. However, due to the school's policy that no elective course should be offered with less than 10 students, no more DAT class were opened after the first HKDSE exam cycle, despite some capable students with potential in the subject showed great interest in reading the subject. Nevertheless, the school has reopened DAT class starting from 2019-2020 academic year. 

The school's teachers and students enjoy a very close-knit relationship together and there is a well known saying of "A Wa Yinger for once, A Wa Yinger for life" (一日華英人，一生華英人。) among Wa Ying's students and alumni.

School Song
The school song, "The old Fatshan there stands Wa Ying" was written by the founding principal. The first line of lyrics changed from "The old Fatshan there stands Wa Ying" to "First in Fatshan, now in Kowloon" after the re-establishment in Hong Kong. The meaning of Cantonese version is slightly different from the English version.

Extracurricular activities

Choir 
The choir is a four-part mixed choir, which includes Soprano, Alto, Tenor and bass. The current number of members is about 60, including 3 pianists. Sometime, the choir also invites famous singers and conductors.

Conductor: 
Ms Ho Siu Hing (-2014)
Ms Chen Chi Wan (2014-)

Recorder Band 
Conductor: 
Ms Ho Siu Hing

List of principals
This list excludes principals during the Foshan years:
 Mr Fong Wing Cheong (1971–1989)
 Miss Ho Seck Fun (1989–1995)
 Mr Mak Chiu (1995–2004)
 Mr Tsang Kai Man (Acting 2004-2006; 2006–2014)
 Miss Lam Mei Yee (2014–2016)
 Dr Wun Chi Wa (2016–)

See also
 Education in Hong Kong

References

External links

 
 Foshan No.1 Middle School, the publicly run secondary school in Foshan founded on the confiscated site of the former Foshan-based Wa Ying Middle School (in simplified Chinese)

Protestant secondary schools in Hong Kong
Secondary schools in Ho Man Tin
Methodist schools